Coupling coefficient, or coupling factor, may refer to:

 Electromechanical coupling coefficient 
 Coupling coefficient (inductors), or coupling factor, between inductances
 Coupling coefficient of resonators
 Coupling factor of power dividers and directional couplers
 Clebsch–Gordan coefficients of angular momentum coupling in quantum mechanics

See also
 Leakage inductance